Memento Materia is a Swedish record label focusing on synth-, electro- and futurepop, although it also released some EBM in the 1990s.  Its first release was in January 1992, and  the label had put out 87 releases (according to its official numbering scheme).  In 2001, it formed Prototyp, a sublabel focusing on EBM, industrial and harder electro, which has put out another 26 releases (again according to its numbering scheme).

List of bands
Below is a list of bands who have had albums released by Memento Materia or Prototyp (not including bands who only appeared on compilations).  Bands in boldface are currently (as of 2006) signed to the label.

Memento Materia
 April Tears
 Backlash
 Code 64
 Covenant
 Daybehavior
 De/Vision
 Hayce
 Iberian Spleen
 Kliche
 Logic Naive
 Malaise
 Mesh
 Michigan
 Mobile Homes
 Nasa
 Native Cry
 Neverwood
 Sadovaja
 Sophie Rimheden/Håkan Lidbo
 Tragic Comedy
 X Marks the Pedwalk
Prototyp
 Colony 5
 Interlace
 Militant Cheerleaders on the Move
 Pouppée Fabrikk
 Pride and Fall
 Project-X
 Run Level Zero
 Thirteenth Exile
 Z Prochek

References
 Official Memento Materia release list. http://www.mementomateria.se/LabelMM.htm.  Retrieved January 3, 2006.
 Official Prototyp release list. http://www.mementomateria.se/LabelPT.htm.  Retrieved January 3, 2006.

External links
 Official site

Swedish record labels
Record labels established in 1992
Synth-pop record labels
Electronic music record labels
Industrial record labels